The County of Weeah is one of the 37 counties of Victoria which are part of the cadastral divisions of Australia, used for land titles. It is located south of Mildura, with the South Australian border to the west. This border was originally intended to be at the 141st meridian of longitude, but because of the South Australia-Victoria border dispute it is several miles to the west of it. The northern boundary of the county is at 35°S, and the eastern at 142°E. Its southern boundary is on the 36°S meridian. The County was proclaimed in 1871 together with the other counties of the Wimmera Land District.

Parishes

 Albacutya
 Boinka
 Bunurouk
 Burr
 Carina
 Conga Wonga
 Danyo
 Duddo
 Gunamalary
 Kattyoong
 Kurnbrunin
 Mamengoroock
 Manpy
 Mulcra
 Nyang
 Pallarang
 Pigick
 Rainbow
 Tutye
 Tyalla
 Tyamoonya
 Underbool
 Wallowa
 Wennga
 Werrap
 Woatwoara
 Worooa

See also
 List of localities in Victoria (Australia)

References
Vicnames, place name details
Research aids, Victoria 1910
Map of the counties of Millewa, Karkarooc, Tatchera and Weeah showing colony and parish boundaries, main roads, telegraph lines and railways.  1886. National Library of Australia

Counties of Victoria (Australia)